Pétanque in the 26th Southeast Asian Games were held in Palembang, Indonesia, from 12 to 17 November 2011. A total of 6 events are held at Jakabaring Sport Complex.

Medal summary

Men

Women

Medal table

External links
  2011 Southeast Asian Games

2011 Southeast Asian Games events
2011